In Polish, grodzisko means a mound or ring of earth remaining on the site of a former gord (gród), or fortified settlement. 

Grodzisko may also refer to any of the following places:
Grodzisko, Gołdap County in Warmian-Masurian Voivodeship (north Poland)
Grodzisko, Gostyń County in Greater Poland Voivodeship (west-central Poland)
Grodzisko, Kartuzy County in Pomeranian Voivodeship (north Poland)
Grodzisko, Kędzierzyn-Koźle County in Opole Voivodeship (south-west Poland)
Grodzisko, Łęczyca County in Łódź Voivodeship (central Poland)
Grodzisko, Lesser Poland Voivodeship (south Poland)
Grodzisko, Leszno County in Greater Poland Voivodeship (west-central Poland)
Grodzisko, Łódź East County in Łódź Voivodeship (central Poland)
Grodzisko, Masovian Voivodeship (east-central Poland)
Grodzisko, Olesno County in Opole Voivodeship (south-west Poland)
Grodzisko, Pisz County in Warmian-Masurian Voivodeship (north Poland)
Grodzisko, Pleszew County in Greater Poland Voivodeship (west-central Poland)
Grodzisko, Podkarpackie Voivodeship (south-east Poland)
Grodzisko, Podlaskie Voivodeship (north-east Poland)
Grodzisko, Pomeranian Voivodeship (north Poland)
Grodzisko, Radomsko County in Łódź Voivodeship (central Poland)
Grodzisko, Silesian Voivodeship (south Poland)
Grodzisko, Strzelce County in Opole Voivodeship (south-west Poland)
Grodzisko, Świętokrzyskie Voivodeship (south-central Poland)

See also 
 Grodzisk (disambiguation)

lt:Grodziskas (reikšmės)